Cimo Röcker (born 21 January 1994) is a German professional footballer who plays as a defender for Hertha BSC II.

Career
Röcker made his debut in the Bundesliga on 26 January 2022 in a 3–0 loss against SC Freiburg, coming on as a substitute for the injured Linus Gechter.

References

Living people
1994 births
Association football defenders
German footballers
Germany youth international footballers
Bundesliga players
3. Liga players
Regionalliga players
SV Werder Bremen players
SV Werder Bremen II players
Hannover 96 II players
SC Fortuna Köln players
FC Viktoria 1889 Berlin players
Hertha BSC II players
Hertha BSC players